Starting in 2002, the American government detained 22 Uyghurs in the Guantanamo Bay detainment camp. The last 3 Uyghur detainees, Yusef Abbas, Hajiakbar Abdulghupur and Saidullah Khalik, were released from Guantanamo on December 29, 2013, and later transferred to Slovakia.

Uyghurs are an ethnic group from Central Asia, native to the Xinjiang Uyghur Autonomous Region in Western China. Since China gained control of Xinjiang in 1949, Uyghurs led a series of rebellions and uprisings against the Chinese, gaining intense leverage in the 90s and early 2000s, culminating in a series of protests, demonstrations, and terrorist attacks. Uyghurs have also frequently called for the international recognition of their own state through the East Turkestan Islamic Movement, which the United States used to recognize as a terrorist group.

The Washington Post reported on August 24, 2005, that fifteen Uyghurs had been determined to be "No longer enemy combatants" (NLECs).
The Post reported that detainees who had been classified as NLEC were, not only still being incarcerated, but one was shackled to the floor for reasons not disclosed by his attorney.  Five of these Uyghurs, who had filed for writs of habeas corpus, were transported to Albania on May 5, 2006, just prior to a scheduled judicial review of their petitions. The other seventeen obtained writs of habeas corpus in 2008.

Common elements in the detainees' testimony

Several of the detainees admitted receiving training on the AK-47, including Bahtiyar Mahnut, Yusef Abbas, and Abdul Hehim. They described being trained by East Turkestan Islamic Movement leaders Abdul Haq and Hassan Maksum. At least one described being trained on a pistol. 

The Uyghurs who were present at the alleged camp reported that they did not expect their camp to be bombed. Some of them acknowledged that they had heard of the September 11 attacks on the radio, but none of them knew that the Taliban were accused of involvement. They all acknowledged having fled the camp when it was bombed. They all stated that they were unarmed. One of the Uyghurs said Maksum was killed in the bombing.

None of the Uyghurs described seeing the United States as an enemy. All of the Uyghurs who mentioned the People's Republic of China described its government as an oppressive occupation. Some of the Uyghurs said that they sought out the training in order to go back to China and defend their fellow Uyghurs against their Chinese occupiers. Some of the other Uyghurs said they sought out the camp of fellow Uyghurs because they were waiting for a visa to Iran, one of the countries they had to pass through on their way to Turkey. They had heard that Turkey would grant them political asylum.

Combatant Status Review Tribunal results

From July 2004 through March 2005, all 568 of the detainees held at Guantanamo had their detention reviewed by Combatant Status Review Tribunals. 38 of the detainees were determined to be NLEC. Five Uyghurs were among the 38 detainees determined not to have been enemy combatants, and were transferred from the main detention camp to Camp Iguana.

This conclusion was remarked on by the first Denbeaux study, that pointed out that many of the detainees who remained incarcerated had faced much less serious allegations than the Uyghurs had faced.

On May 10, 2006, Radio Free Asia reported that the five Uyghurs transported to Albania were the only Uyghurs who had been moved to Camp Iguana.

In September 2007, the Department of Defense published dossiers prepared from the unclassified documents arising from the captives' Combatant Status Review Tribunals.
Information paper: Uighur Detainee Population at JTF-GTMO

Asylum in Albania
None of the Uyghurs wanted to be returned to China. The United States declined to grant the Uyghurs political asylum, or to allow them parole, or even freedom on the Naval Base.

Some of the Uyghurs had lawyers who volunteered to help them pursue a writ of habeas corpus, which would have been one step in getting them freed from U.S. detention.

In the case of Qassim v. Bush, those Uyghurs argued for their writ of habeas corpus in United States Court of Appeals for the District of Columbia Circuit was scheduled to hear arguments on Monday May 8, 2006. Five of the Uyghurs were transported to Albania, on Friday May 5, 2006; the United States officials filed an emergency motion to dismiss later that day.  The court dismissed the case as moot.

Barbara Olshansky, one of the Uyghur's lawyers, characterized the sudden transfer as an attempt to: "... avoid having to answer in court for keeping innocent men in jail,"

Some press reports state that the Uyghurs have been granted political asylum in Albania. But the U.S. government press release merely states that they are applying for asylum in Albania.

On May 9, 2006, the Associated Press reported that the People's Republic of China (PRC) denounced the transfer of custody.
The PRC called the transfer of the Uyghurs to Albania a violation of international law. Albania agreed to examine the evidence against the men.

Radio Free Asia reports that the five were staying at a National Center for Refugees in a Tirana suburb.

On May 24, 2006, Abu Bakr Qasim told interviewers that he and his compatriots felt isolated in Albania.  Qasim described his disappointment with the United States, who the Uyghurs had been hoping would support the Uyghurs quest for Uyghur autonomy. To the BBC he said that "Guantanamo was a five-year nightmare. We're trying to forget it".In an interview with ABC News Qasim said that members of the American-Uyghur community had come forward and assured the U.S. government that they would help him and his compatriots adapt to life in the United States, if they were given asylum there.<ref name=Abc060523>Guantanamo's Innocents: Newly Released Prisoners Struggle to Find a Home, ABC News, May 23, 2006.</ref>

On June 19, 2008, the Associated Press reported that Adel Abdu Al-Hakim had been denied political asylum in Sweden.
Sten De Geer, his Swedish lawyer, plans to appeal the ruling, because Albania will not allow his wife and children to join him.

On February 9, 2009, Reuters reported that the five Uyghurs in Albania had heard from the seventeen Uyghurs left behind in Guantanamo, and that their conditions had improved.

Allegations of Sino-American collusion
An article in the December 5, 2006, edition of The Washington Post reported on a legal appeal launched on behalf of seven of the Uyghurs remaining in detention in Guantanamo.
The article reports that the Uyghurs' lawyers argued that the evidence against their clients was essentially identical to that against the five Uyghurs who were released; that the process by which their "enemy combatant" status had been determined, and reviewed, was flawed.

The article went on to quote Washington officials, and former officials, about whether the group that the Uyghurs were accused of belonging to had been added to the State Department's list of Terrorist organizations largely to secure acquiescence from the PRC to the then imminent U.S. invasion of Iraq. It quoted the Uyghurs' lawsuit: "In the crisis atmosphere of the time, the interests of a few dozen refugees paled beside the urgency of the Administration's war plans," and  Susan Baker Manning, one of the Uyghurs' lawyers: "It is amazing to me that the US has agreed to in effect hold political prisoners for China in exchange for anything. That goes against everything that we, I thought, stood for in this country."

Guantanamo spokesman, Commander Jeffrey Gordon, responded to the appeal with the comment: "There is a significant amount of evidence, both unclassified and classified, which supports detention by U.S. forces," According to the Associated Press Gordon told reporters that "the seven had 'multiple' reviews and were properly classified as enemy combatants."

An article about the Uyghurs' appeal, in The Jurist, citing the Fifth Denbeaux Report: The no-hearing hearings, called the Uighur's Combatant Status Review Tribunals "show trials".

In April 2007, their lawyer Sabin Willett described their situation as:

A May 2008 report by the Inspector General of the United States Department of Justice claimed that American military interrogators appeared to have collaborated with visiting Chinese officials at Guantánamo Bay to enact sleep deprivation of the Uyghur detainees. A bipartisan Senate Armed Services Committee report, released in part in December 2008 and in full in April 2009, concluded that the legal authorization of "Enhanced interrogation techniques" led directly to the abuse and killings of prisoners in US military facilities. Brutal abuse believed to originate in China torture techniques to extract false confessions from American POWs migrated from Guantanamo Bay to Afghanistan, then to Iraq and Abu Ghraib.

Held in isolation, in Camp Six

On March 11, 2007, the Boston Globe reported that the 17 remaining Uyghur captives had been transferred to the newly built Camp Six, in Guantanamo.
The Globe reports that the Uyghurs are held for 22 hours a day in cells without natural light.

The Globe points out that prior to their detention in Camp Six, they were able to socialize with one another, but that they couldn't speak to the prisoners in neighboring cells because none of them speak Arabic or Pashto. The Globe quotes Sabin Willett, the Uyghur's lawyer, who reports that, consequently, there has been a serious decline in the Uyghur's mental health.

According to the Globe: "The military says the Uighurs were put there either because they attacked guards or trashed their quarters during the riot last May."

The Globe quotes Sabin Willett's explanation for the Uyghur's new harsher detention. Willett: "... links their assignment to Camp Six to a filing he made seeking their release."

Passage of the Military Commissions Act and the Detainee Treatment Act
In the Summer of 2006, the habeas corpus submissions known as Hamdan v. Rumsfeld reached the United States Supreme Court.
The Supreme Court ruled the Executive Branch lacked the Constitutional authority to initiate military commissions to try Guantanamo captives.
However, it also ruled that the United States Congress did have the authority to set up military commissions. In the fall of 2006, Congress passed the Military Commissions Act, setting up military commissions similar to those initially set up by the Executive Branch.

The Act also stripped captives of the right to file habeas corpus submissions in the US Court system. The earlier Detainee Treatment Act, passed on December 31, 2005, had stripped captives of the right to initiate new habeas corpus submissions, while leaving existing habeas corpus motions in progress.

The Detainee Treatment Act had explicitly authorized an appeal process for Combatant Status Review Tribunals which failed to follow the military's own rules.
And Sabin Willet, the Uyghur's lawyer, has chosen to initiate appeals of the Uyghur's Combatant Status Review Tribunals.

However, Willet argues, the Combatant Status Review Tribunals failed to consider the interrogator's conclusions that the Uyghurs were not enemies, had not supported the Taliban, and had not engaged in hostilities.

Assistant Attorney General Peter D. Keisler led the response team. Keisler's team accused Willet of trying to:

They said the argument boiled down to:

Asylum negotiations
The Uyghurs can not be repatriated to China because domestic U.S. law proscribes deporting individuals to countries where they are likely to be abused.

The Bush administration conducted bilateral negotiations with a number of other countries, to accept captives who had been cleared for release, with very limited success.
Frustrated British officials who were negotiating for the return of Guantanamo captives who had been granted UK residency permission prior to their capture leaked the conditions Bush administration officials were trying to insist upon. Bush officials were insisting that Britain either indefinitely incarcerate the men, upon their arrival—or they place them under round the clock surveillance.

Early release discussions
The Asia Times reported, on November 4, 2004, that there had been internal discussion over how the US could release Uyghurs, without putting their safety at risk.

Asylum in Canada
On June 2, 2008, The Globe and Mail reported that recently released documents suggested that the Government of Canada had come close to offering asylum to the Uyghurs.
The Globe reports that Canadian officials held back from offering the Uyghur captives asylum out of fear that the PRC government would retaliate against Huseyin Celil, a Canadian citizen of Uyghur background, who was in Chinese custody.

On February 4, 2009, The Globe and Mail reported that Hassan Anvar's refugee claim, and the refugee claims of two of his compatriots were close to completion.
The article quoted Mehmet Tohti, a Uyghur human rights activist who stated that he had met with Immigration Minister Jason Kenney.
According to the Globe, Tohti claimed there had been a positive consensus to admit Anvar, and two men whose lawyers haven't authorized their names to be released.
According to the Canwest News Service, Kenney is considering issuing special ministerial permits for the three Uyghurs.
According to Reuters, Alyshan Velshi, from Kenney's office, disputed whether Canada was close to accepting any Uyghurs.
The other fourteen Uyghurs hadn't yet satisfied an obligation Canada expects of refugee claimants—that they establish their identity.

The Don Valley Refugee Resettlement Organization is sponsoring Hassan Anvar's refugee claim.
The archdiocese of Montreal is sponsoring the other two men. Their sponsors will support the men with housing and clothing, if they are admitted.

Role of American Uyghurs
An article published by the Associated Press on October 10, 2008, quoted Elshat Hassan and Nury Turkel, two leaders of the Uyghur American Association, about plans for American-Uyghurs to help the Uyghur detainees acclimatize, once they have been admitted to the USA. Court records included a detailed plan by the UAA to assist Uyghur detainees in resettling in the United States. Turkel said the Uyghurs are as oppressed as the Tibetans, but they don't receive as much recognition because they lack a high-profile leader, like the Dalai Lama.

Asylum in Munich
In February 2009, the Munich city council passed a motion to invite the remaining seventeen Uyghurs to settle in Munich, home to the largest community of Uyghurs outside of China.

Temporary asylum in Palau
In June 2009, Palauan President Johnson Toribiong agreed to "temporarily resettle" up to seventeen of the Uyghur detainees, at the United States' request.

On September 10, 2009, The Times reported that three of the Uyghurs, Dawut Abdurehim and Anwar Assan, and another man whose identity has not been made public, have accepted the invitation to be transferred to asylum in Palau.

On September 19, 2009, Fox News reported that in the week since the first announcement three further Uyghurs agreed to be transferred to Palau.
Fox reported that five of the other Uyghurs had refused to speak with Palau officials.

On October 31, 2009, Ahmad Tourson, Abdul Ghappar Abdul Rahman, Edham Mamet, Anwar Hassan, Dawut Abdurehim and Adel Noori were reported to have been transferred to Palau.

On June 29, 2015, Nathan Vanderklippe, reporting in The Globe and Mail, wrote that all the Uyghurs had quietly left Palau.
The Globe confirmed that Palau's agreement to give refuge to the Uyghurs was reached after the USA agreed to various secret payments.  Those payments included $93,333 to cover each Uyghurs living expenses.  The Globe confirmed that controversy still surrounded former President Johnson Toribiong who had used some of those funds to billet the Uyghurs in houses belonging to his relatives.

Vanderklippe reported that the men had never felt they could fit in with the Palauans.  
Some of the men compared Palau with a lusher, larger Guantanamo.  Some of the men were able to bring their wives to Palau.  Attempts to hold most regular jobs failed, due to cultural differences.  Attempts to use their traditional leather-working skills to be self-employed failed.  Eventually, all six men were employed as night-time security guards, a job that did not require interaction with Palauans.

Tragically, one of the men's young toddler, conceived and born on Palau, died after he fell off a balcony.  
According to Vanderklippe, the men's departure from Palau was quietly arranged with cooperation with American officials.  He reported they left, one or two at a time, on commercial flights.  Palauan officials would not share the Uyghurs destination.

In September 2018, some Indian newspapers reported that a suspected militant had been radicalized when he lived in Palau.  The Australian Broadcasting Corporation considered the credibility of this claim, noting that the Indian man's five years in Palau overlapped with the Uyghurs.

Bermuda
On June 11, 2009, Abdul Helil Mamut, Huzaifa Parhat, Emam Abdulahat and Jalal Jalaladin arrived in the British overseas territory of Bermuda.
The cost of the relocation will be borne by the United States, while the government of Bermuda would arrange documentation, residence and housing.

According to their lawyers, the four men will be "guest workers" in Bermuda; according to Premier of Bermuda Ewart Brown, they will be given the opportunity to become naturalised "citizens" — currently impossible under Bermudian law, and a right which many residents, locally born and raised, do not have — with the ability to eventually travel freely.
The decision was made without the knowledge of Richard Gozney, the Governor of Bermuda, responsible for foreign affairs and security matters, who only found out after their arrival.
Brown's promise of "citizenship" was apparently made without the knowledge of the British government, whose citizenship is being offered.  The offer of asylum was strongly criticised both within Bermuda and by the UK. This was not the first time that Bermuda hosted refugees; during the 1970s, five people from Vietnam were allowed into the country; only one remains there, following the emigration of three others and the death of the fifth.  The following day, the Opposition United Bermuda Party moved for a motion of no confidence against Brown, while the British government declared its intentions to review its legal relationship with the territory.

On September 29, 2011, the Antigua Observer quoted Henry Bellingham the United Kingdom's Overseas Territories Minister on the UK's expectation that the US would find a permanent home for the four Uyghurs in another country.

This is something that we weren't consulted on by the last (Brown) administration. We have spoken to the United States about it — it's our understanding that the arrangement was not to be permanent and we're looking to the US State Department to find a permanent solution. We're working with them to try and achieve that.

El Salvador

On April 19, 2012, the Associated Press reported that Abdul Razakah and Hammad Memet had been transferred to El Salvador.
Ben Fox, writing for the Associated Press wrote that the men had already begun to learn Spanish.
El Salvador officials said the men had been given refuge because many El Salvador citizens had been allowed refuge in other countries when their country was hit by civil war.

In September 2013, El Salvador reported that both men quietly slipped out of El Salvador, and that their destination was unknown but presumed to be Turkey.

Slovakia

On December 27, 2013, it was announced that the Government of Slovakia would give asylum to the three remaining Uyghurs.
When making the announcement the Government of Slovakia said that the three men had "never been suspected of nor charged with a criminal act of terrorism".  A long-standing sticking point in getting third countries to accept former captives is that US negotiators wanted those countries to agree to impose draconian and expensive security measures on the former captives.
Carol Rosenberg, of the Miami Herald, the journalist who has provided the most extensive coverage of the Guantanamo camp, described the announcement, following the releases of three other groups of men, earlier in December, marked a "significant milestone".

Rosenberg reported that the US military had transferred Yusef Abbas, Hajiakbar Abdulghuper and Saidullah Khalik, to Slovakia on December 30, 2013, in a "secret operation".
Rosenberg quoted from a press release US District Court Judge Ricardo Urbina had prepared to be made public after the last Uyghur was transferred, where he expressed his dissatisfaction with the Obama administration for not honoring his original release order.

Supreme Court's ruling in Boumediene v. Bush
On June 12, 2008, the United States Supreme Court ruled on Boumediene v. Bush.
Its ruling overturned aspects of the Detainee Treatment Act and Military Commissions Act, allowing Guantanamo captives to access the US justice system for habeas petitions.

Parhat v. Gates
On Monday, June 23, 2008, it was announced that a three judge Federal court of appeal had ruled, in Parhat v. Gates, on Friday, June 20, 2008, that the determination of Hozaifa Parhat's Combatant Status Review Tribunal was "invalid".

Motions following Boumediene v. Bush
On July 7, 2008, a petition was filed on behalf of the seventeen Uyghurs.
On August 5, 2008, the United States Department of Justice opposed Parhat being released in the US, and to having a judgment made on his habeas petition.
The Government's opposition filing was 22 pages long.

Petition to be moved from solitary confinement
In early August 2008, US District Court Judge Ricardo M. Urbina declined to rule in favor of transferring six of the Uyghurs from Camp 6 where captives are held in solitary confinement to Camp 4 where they live in communal barracks with fellow captives.
Urbina's nine-page memorandum opinion addressed the needs of Hammad Memet, Khalid Ali, Edham Mamet, Bahtiyar Mahnut, Arkin Mahmud, Adel Noori.
{| class="wikitable" border="1"
|
What is clear is that no court has ever ruled that detainees, designated as enemy combatants, have a right to challenge the conditions of their confinement pursuant to the constitutional writ of habeas corpus. Furthermore, courts are reluctant to second-guess day-to-day operations of domestic prison facilities, especially when doing so intrudes upon the military and national security affairs. This deference combined with the paucity of evidence of irreparable injury and the petitioners' failure to articulate a specific constitutional right and standard from which to analyze the facts of this case presses the court to deny the petitioners' motion for a TRO and a preliminary injunction.
|}

No longer classed as "enemy combatants"

On September 30, 2008, Gregory Katsas, Assistant Attorney General filed a "notice of status" for the remaining Uyghur captives—stating that they would no longer be classed as "enemy combatants".
According to The AM Law Daily the Department of Justice was scheduled to appear before Ricardo M Urbina on October 7, 2008, to defend classifying the men as enemy combatants.

Although they were no longer considered "enemy combatants" camp authorities continued to hold six of the men in solitary confinement.

On Tuesday October 7, 2008, US District Court Judge Ricardo Urbina ruled that the Uyghurs had to be brought to the US to appear in his court in Washington DC on Friday, 10 October 2008.

The United States Department of Justice filed an emergency motion to stay the Uyghurs' admission to the US.
On October 8, 2008, a three judge appeal panel granted the emergency motion to stay the Uyghur's transfer. The judges stay was to enable the appeals court to consider the merits of the parties' arguments. The parties to file briefs by October 16, 2008.

On October 16, 2008, Clint Williamson, the State Department official responsible for negotiating a new home for the captives, complained that the Justice Department's description of the Uyghurs had undermined his efforts.
Williamson is the State Department's ambassador-at-large for war crimes issues.
The New York Times quoted Williamson's comment about cancelling his overseas trips following the Department of Justice claims:
{| class="wikitable" border="1"
|
I was scheduled to depart on another round of negotiations early this week. It was impossible to resolve some concerns we had about going forward at the time. As a result I canceled the trip.
|}

Supreme Court ruling on whether the judiciary can force captives to be released in the United States
On October 20, 2009, the United States Supreme Court announced it would hear an appeal filed on behalf of the Uyghurs, as to whether Justice Leon had the authority to order the Uyghurs to be released in the United States.
A panel of appeal court judges had overruled Leon.
The appeal was filed on behalf of Hazaifa Parhat and seven other of the Uyghur captives.  But the court's ruling would apply to all the Uyghurs, and would affect the appeals of other captives whose habeas hearings have overturned their CSR Tribunals. On March 1, 2010 the Supreme Court ruled in a per curiam decision that no court had yet ruled on this case in light of the offers of resettlement. Therefore, the Supreme Court declined to rule on the question of whether a federal court has the right to release the prisoners held at Guantanamo Bay, as  "[The Supreme Court is] a court of review, not of first view."

Turkistan Islamic Party reaction
The Turkistan Islamic Party in the 2nd issue of its magazine "Islamic Turkistan" discussed the situation of Uyghur Turkistan Islamic Party members in Guantanamo Bay which was getting media attention.

The Uyghur detainees

|}

Radio Free Asia named the five released Uyghurs, but the report identified the Uyghurs with different transliterations than that used in the U.S. press release: Ababehir Qasim, Adil Abdulhakim, Ayuphaji Mahomet, Ahter and Ahmet.

See also
 East Turkestan

References

External links
 Arkley denies Uighurs here permanently June 13, 2011
 Palau urges Australia to allow permanent resettlement for six Uighurs Radio Australia June 3, 2010
 Uighurs demand release on US soil Bangkok Post April 7, 2010
 Guantanamo Uighurs start new life in Palau BBC Newsnight January 14, 2010
 Australia urged to accept Uighurs The National January 5, 2010
 Life after Guantanamo - Video
 Uighur inmate in Guantanamo plea, March 20, 2008, BBC
  
Uighurs: U.S. Let Chinese Abuse Us At Gitmo by Ryan Grim, The Huffington Post, June 16, 2009
Human Rights First; Habeas Works: Federal Courts’ Proven Capacity to Handle Guantánamo Cases (2010)
 When China Convinced the U.S. That Uighurs Were Waging Jihad

Uyghurs